Drew & Napier LLC  is one of Singapore’s leading law firms. Founded in 1889, the firm has more than 500 employees. It is regarded as one of the “Big Four” law firms in Singapore.

Drew & Napier regularly advises governments, government institutions, regulatory authorities, financial institutions, local and multi-national corporations, including Fortune 500 and blue-chip companies, conglomerates, educational and non-profit organizations, and high-profile individuals.

In Singapore and the Southeast Asian region, the lawyers of Drew & Napier are particularly known for their expertise in litigation, international arbitration, insolvency, intellectual property, competition law, telecommunications, media & information technology, and tax matters. The firm has market-leading practices in mergers and acquisitions, corporate finance, employment and real estate & construction law. 

The chairman and chief executive officer of the firm are Senior Counsel (similar to a Queen's Counsel in the United Kingdom) Jimmy Yim, and Senior Counsel Cavinder Bull. The firm has an additional Senior Counsel, Siraj Omar.

In 2020, Drew & Napier LLC initiated alliances with other influential legal firms to launch a regional network of blue-chip firms. On 2 March 2020, Drew & Napier LLC from Singapore, Shearn Delamore & Co. from Malaysia, and Makarim & Taira S. from Indonesia came together to form Drew Network Asia (DNA).

History 
The firm was founded in 1889 when Manchester barrister Walter John Napier joined English solicitor Alfred Henry Drew.
In 2000, Drew & Napier formed into a limited liability company. The firm in 2011 moved to its current location at Ocean Financial Centre, Collyer Quay, Singapore.

Notable lawyers 
Government
 David Marshall – Singapore's first Chief Minister 
 Hri Kumar Nair, SC - Deputy Attorney-General
 Indranee Rajah, SC – Minister, Prime Minister's Office; Second Minister for Finance and Education
 Joseph Grimberg, SC - Judicial Commissioner of the Supreme Court, Singapore (1987-1989); first to be appointed Senior Counsel by the Chief Justice in January 1997 when this category was introduced
 Judge of Appeal Judith Prakash – Judge of Appeal of the Court of Appeal of Singapore
 Lucien Wong, SC – Attorney-General of Singapore
 Judge of Appeal Steven Chong – Judge of Appeal of the Court of Appeal of Singapore
 Professor S. Jayakumar - Former Deputy Prime Minister, former Minister for Foreign Affairs, Home Affairs, Law and Labour, and former Coordinating Minister for National Security

Legal
 Tan Cheng Han, SC – Chairman, EW Barker Centre for Law & Business at the Faculty of Law at the National University of Singapore; Chairman, Singapore Exchange Regulation Co
Davinder Singh, SC – Chairman, Singapore International Arbitration Centre

Awards and accolades 
 Named Singapore Litigation Law Firm of the Year at the Asian Legal Business Southeast Asia Law Awards 2019 for 15 years.
 Singapore Litigation Law Firm of the Year, Regional Litigation Law Firm of the Year, Debt Market Deal of the Year (Premium) and M&A Deal of the Year (Premium) at the Asian Legal Business Southeast Asia Law Awards 2018.
 Regional Litigation Law Firm of the Year and Singapore Intellectual Property Law Firm of the Year at the Asian Legal Business Southeast Asia Law Awards 2019. 
Named Employer of Choice 2020 by Asian Legal Business for 11 years.
Ranked Band 1 by Chambers and Partners 2020 for Litigation, Intellectual Property, Restructuring & Insolvency, Telecommunications, Media & Technology (TMT), and Competition / Antitrust.
Ranked Tier 1 by IFLR1000 2020 for Restructuring & Insolvency. Capital Markets, Banking & Finance, Mergers & Acquisitions and Project Development are leading practices.
Ranked Tier 1 by Legal 500 Asia-Pacific 2020 for Dispute Resolution, Employment, Competition / Antitrust, Private Wealth, Intellectual Property, and Restructuring & Insolvency.
Ranked Tier 1 by Asian Legal Business 2020 IP Rankings in the areas of Patents and Trademarks / Copyrights for 8 years.
Recognised as one of the world's top 100 international arbitration practices in 2020 by the Global Arbitration Review for 11 years. 
Recognised as one of the world's top 20 international restructuring practices in 2019 by the Global Restructuring Review for 2 years.
Named Singapore Firm of the Year at the Asialaw Regional Awards 2019. 
Named Commercial & Transactions Firm of the Year at the Benchmark Litigation Asia-Pacific Awards 2019.
Recipient of TMT Deal of the Year Award at the Asia Legal Awards 2019.  Previous recipient of Finance Deal of the Year: Insolvency & Restructuring and M&A Deal of the Year: Southeast Asia at the Asia Legal Awards 2018.
The first Singapore-based law firm to win India Practice, Asian Law Firm of the Year at the inaugural Asian Legal Business India Law Awards 2019.
Named winner of the inaugural China practice, Asian Law Firm of the Year Award at the Asian Legal Business China Law Awards 2019.
Named Singapore Firm of the Year award for Patent at the Asia IP Awards 2019. Double winner at the 2018 Asia IP Awards: Singapore Trade Mark Firm of the Year; Singapore Patent Firm of the Year. Previous recipient of the Singapore Trade Mark Firm of the Year award in 2016 for 5 consecutive years.
Named Singapore Trade Mark Prosecution Firm of the Year at the inaugural Managing Intellectual Property Asia Pacific Awards 2019.  Previous winner of the 2018 Prosecution IP Firm of the Year award at the inaugural Managing Intellectual Property Asia Pacific Awards. Previously recipient of the Singapore Contentious Intellectual Property Firm of the Year 2017 by Managing Intellectual Property for 5 years.
Named National Law Firm of the Year – Singapore at the Asialaw & Benchmark Asia-Pacific Dispute Resolution Awards 2018.
Named Regional and Specialist firm for India work by the India Business Law Journal in 2018 for 5 consecutive years.
Named Southeast Asia Law Firm of the Year and Real Estate Law Firm of the Year at the Year at the Asian Legal Business Southeast Asia Law Awards 2017.
Recipient of Matter of the Year at the Asialaw Litigation Asia-Pacific Dispute Resolution Awards 2017.
 Named a Top 10 firm in Asia in Asian Legal Business’ Innovative List 2016.
 Recipient of Restructuring Deal of the Year Awards at the IFLR Asia Awards 2016.
 Named Best Domestic Arbitration Firm of the Year at the Asialaw Asia-Pacific Dispute Resolution Awards 2015.
Recipient of M&A Deal of the Year Awards at the IFLR Asia Awards 2014.

Corporate social responsibility 
As part of the firm's Corporate Social Responsibility & Pro Bono Legal Services programme, Drew & Napier lawyers offer complimentary legal advice at legal clinics, assist charities and non-profit organization with their registration procedures, agreements, and other legal matters, and also act on legal matters for accused individuals without means.

In 2019, Drew & Napier was conferred “The Contributor of the Year” award by The Singapore Law Society, which recognizes law firms that have made a significant monetary contribution to the Law Society through sponsorships and donations.

Drew also received the ‘Impact Award’ at Trustlaw Awards 2014, and the “Best Contribution from Law Firm Award” by the Legal Aid Bureau in 2012, 2014, and 2016.

The firm was the only law firm to receive an award in the ‘Large-Firm’ category in the Legal Aid Bureau Best Contribution from Law Firm Award 2012 (Large Firm – Silver Award) by the Ministry of Law in recognition of its Pro Bono contribution.

References

Law firms of Singapore
1889 establishments in Singapore
Law firms established in 1889